Yousef Al-Reshedi is a Saudi Arabian football player.

External links
au.eurosport.com Profile
soccerpunter.com Profile

1988 births
Living people
Saudi Arabian footballers
Al-Shoulla FC players
Al-Kawkab FC players
Saudi First Division League players
Saudi Professional League players
Saudi Second Division players
Association football forwards